Manzanares el Real is a 8,936 inhabitant town (2020 statistics from ine.es) in the northern area of the autonomous Community of Madrid. It is located at the foot of The Pedriza, a part of the Sierra de Guadarrama, and next to the embalse de Santillana (the Santillana reservoir).

Main sights
The New Castle of Manzanares el Real, the best conserved castle in the Community of Madrid. Construction commencing in 1475, it has been used in several motion pictures, most notably El Cid.
The Old Castle of Manzanares el Real is the ruin of a former fortress,  also known as Plaza de Armas. Only two walls remain standing, now integrated into a garden complex. It was built in Mudejar style of granite with brick curbing.
Church of Nuestra Señora de las Nieves, founded in the early 14th century. It has a nave and two  aisles, separated by arcades on stone columns. The nave, in Romanesque styles, ends into a pentagonal presbytery. The church has also a 16th-century Renaissance portico.
Hermitage of  Nuestra Señora de la Peña Sacra.
The Town Square and the Town Hall Houses - The Square has always been, and remains the place for celebrations, where local events, celebrations, and social life take place. The Town Hall Houses are peculiar because although our municipality was the head of the County of El Real de Manzanares, they did not exist as such: they were the County jail. It has always preserved its portico, the balcony, and its railings, a construction that may have been commissioned by the Great Cardinal Mendoza in the 16th century.

Bus

There are three lines passing through the village, which are the following: 

 SE720: Colmenar Viejo - Manzanares el Real

 720: Colmenar Viejo - Collado Villalba

 724: Madrid (Plaza de Castilla) - Manzanares el Real - El Boalo

References

External links
Official website 
The Castle of Manzanares el Real - History and photos
English Language tourist website

Municipalities in the Community of Madrid